Żurawin  (Zhuravyn) is a settlement in the administrative district of Gmina Lutowiska, within Bieszczady County, Subcarpathian Voivodeship, in south-eastern Poland, close to the border with Ukraine.

References

Villages in Bieszczady County